Space Trader is a video game by the Canadian developer HermitWorks Entertainment, for Microsoft Windows and Mac OS X released on July 25, 2007. After the game was open-sourced in 2008, an iOS version followed in 2009.

Pilot 
You are a pilot who starts their trading adventure. Caught in the grips of a villainous loan shark, you work your way out of debt and align yourself with the rule abiding trade federation or the shady black market. Further on you gain the choice to choose your real trade. Either becoming partners with a procurement specialist, subsidies trader, or a luxury importer, you make your own way in space. After you are established, you build your personal wealth before you claim your own company and build more onto your industrial renown. 

Apart from trading there are also a variety of bosses you can fight either for story progression, or bounties. These fights come with a first person shooter gameplay. Each ranges from a simple bootlegger to high ranking corrupt officials. Take down their minions around themed maps and defeat the heads of crime your financiers want.

Gameplay 

Space Trader is a combination first person action and trading game with co-operative multiplayer, tied together with online scoreboards. Players assume the role of Traders in a fictitious future universe. Their goal: to make as much money possible within a time limit. They accomplish this by leasing cargo ships, traveling to planets and trading with Merchants. Each Merchant trades different commodities, and each at different prices. Finding successful trade routes between these merchants is one of the strategic elements of the game. Players can also be stopped along the way by an omni-present government organization known as the Ministry of Accounts, and forced to pay taxes. As well, shady informants reveal the location of black market merchants and the location of criminal bosses, which the players can attempt to bring down for the bounty placed on their head by the Ministry of Accounts.

In multiplayer, players work together in combat and attempt to thwart each other in trading by taking as many bonuses as they can from other players. All scores from games are uploaded to the Space Trader website, and players are ranked against one another. The Space Trader website features community scoreboards and forums, along with information about the game.

History 
Space Trader was developed on base of the open-source id Tech 3 engine, as the first commercial title to use that engine since it was open sourced in August 2005.
The game's development started in 2005, headed by Cameron Tofer and Marcia Tofer, both previously of BioWare, along with a group of other developers that have joined along the way. 
The game was released for Microsoft Windows and Mac OS X on July 25, 2007. Currently Space Trader is at version 1.0.4, with a beta version of 1.0.6 available. A free demo is also available on the website.

In April 2008 Space Trader's source code in version 1.1.14 was released.

An iOS version was released in 2009 as Space Trader: Moon Madness.

Reception

Reviews
The Adrenaline Vault
GameFocus
Generation: Gamerz
Bytten
Out of Eight
GamePlasma
Killer Betties
IGN

References

External links 
  at the Wayback Machine
 

2007 video games
Commercial video games with freely available source code
IOS games
MacOS games
Space trading and combat simulators
Video games developed in Canada
Windows games